"Hold Me in Your Arms" is a song by Australian pop-rock band Southern Sons. It was released in March 1991 as the third single taken from their debut studio album, Southern Sons (1990). The song peaked at number 9 in Australia, becoming the band's second top ten single.

At the ARIA Music Awards of 1992, the song was nominated for ARIA Award for Song of the Year, losing to "Treaty (Filthy Lucre Remix)" by Yothu Yindi.

Track listing
CD single (105207)

Charts

Weekly charts

Year-end charts

Dami Im and Jack Jones version

In January 2017, Dami Im sang the song with Guy Sebastian at the Australia Day concert. Sony Music Australia boss Denis Handlin commissioned the new version and secured the original voice of the song by Jack Jones to recreate the song with Im. The Dami Im and Jack Jones version was released on 7 April 2017.

References

1990 songs
1991 singles
2017 singles
Southern Sons songs
Dami Im songs
RCA Records singles
Songs written by Phil Buckle
Rock ballads